The 1948 South Carolina United States Senate election was held on November 2, 1948 to select the U.S. Senator from the state of South Carolina.  Incumbent Democratic Senator Burnet R. Maybank won the Democratic primary and defeated Republican challenger J. Bates Gerald in the general election to win another six-year term.

Democratic primary

Candidates
Neville Bennett
William Jennings Bryan Dorn, U.S. Representative from Greenwood
Alan Johnstone
Burnet R. Maybank, incumbent Senator since 1941
Marcus A. Stone

Results
Senator Maybank narrowly achieved a majority of the primary vote, avoiding a potential run-off election against Dorn.

General election

Campaign
Since the end of Reconstruction in 1877, the Democratic Party dominated the politics of South Carolina and its statewide candidates were never seriously challenged. Maybank did not campaign for the general election as there was no chance of defeat.

Results

|-
| 
| colspan=5 |Democratic hold
|-

See also
List of United States senators from South Carolina
United States Senate elections, 1948 and 1949
United States House of Representatives elections in South Carolina, 1948

References

"Supplemental Report of the Secretary of State to the General Assembly of South Carolina." Reports and Resolutions of South Carolina to the General Assembly of the State of South Carolina. Volume I. Columbia, SC: 1949, p. 11.

South Carolina
1948
1948 South Carolina elections